Mount Airy, also known as the Grandma Moses House and Major James Crawford House, is a historic home located at Verona, Augusta County, Virginia. It was built about 1840, and is a two-story, five-bay, single-pile brick I-house. It has a rear -story, brick ell addition with porch built about 1850. Also on the property are a contributing washhouse (c. 1900), shed (c. 1900), and wagon house (c. 1921). The American artist Grandma Moses (1860–1961) and her husband Thomas Solomon Moses owned the house from January 1901 to September 1902. It was the first house they owned in their married lives.

It was listed on the National Register of Historic Places in 2012.

References

Houses on the National Register of Historic Places in Virginia
Houses completed in 1840
Houses in Augusta County, Virginia
National Register of Historic Places in Augusta County, Virginia